USS Edgar G. Chase (DE-16) was an  "short-hull" destroyer escort in the service of the United States Navy named after Edgar Griffith Chase, executive officer of a destroyer lost at Guadalcanal in 1942.

Edgar G. Chase was launched on 26 September 1942 by Mare Island Navy Yard, Solano County, California as HMS Burges (BDE-16); sponsored for British Lend-Lease by Mrs. Ernest H. Wichels, but retained by the USN and assigned the name Edgar G. Chase on 19 February 1943; and commissioned 20 March 1943.

Service history

World War II
Edgar G. Chase reported to the Submarine chaser Training Center at Miami, Florida, 4 June 1943, and for the next year trained student officers and patrolled off Florida. Edgar G. Chase sailed from New York on 19 September with a slow-moving convoy for England. With bad weather, the passage took a month; she got back to Norfolk on 22 November.

Edgar G. Chase made three voyages as convoy escort from New York and Norfolk to Oran from 19 December 1944 – 30 May 1945.

On 20 July, she returned to Miami, Florida, and her original training duty with the Small Craft Training Center.

Post-War
She arrived at Charleston, South Carolina on 9 September and was decommissioned there on 16 October 1945, being sold for scrap on 18 March 1947.

Awards

References

External links

 

Evarts-class destroyer escorts
World War II frigates and destroyer escorts of the United States
Ships built in Vallejo, California
1942 ships